The Middlesbrough Trophy (or JD Sports Cup for sponsorship reasons) was an invitational football tournament held at the Riverside, Middlesbrough. The only edition took place between 1 and 2 August 1998. It was contested by four teams.

Tournament

Bracket 

Benfica beat Newcastle United 4–3 on penalties.

Newcastle United beat Middlesbrough 4–3 on penalties.

Benfica beat Empoli 7–6 on penalties.

Results

References

English football friendly trophies
Defunct football cup competitions in England
Sport in Middlesbrough
Football in North Yorkshire
1998–99 in English football
1998–99 in Italian football
1998–99 in Portuguese football
1998 establishments in England
Middlesbrough F.C.